Ivan Petlin (17th-century diminutive form, Ivashko (Evashko) Petlin), a Siberian Cossack, was the first Russian to have reached China on an official mission (1618-1619). His expedition may have been the second European expedition to reach China from the west by an overland route (after that of Bento de Góis) since the fall of the Yuan Dynasty. For background, see Russia-China relations.

Although sent by the Czar he was not officially an ambassador. The mission was outfitted by the Tobolsk and Tomsk voyevodas. Petlin was originally appointed as translator and scribe under Maksim Trupcheninov, but at the last minute Trupcheninov was unable to go so Petlin became leader. His traveling companion was named Andrei Mundov (Mundoff).

Accompanied by two returning envoys from the Altyn Khan who was one of leader of Western Mongolia, Petlin and Mundov left Tomsk on 9 May 1618 and went south up the Ob River, crossed the Abakan Range, went south to Tuva and around  Lake Ubsa to the court of the Altyn Khan. (This route was rarely used in later times.) 

From there he traveled east across Mongolia to the Great Wall and reached Peking in late August. He was not allowed to see the Wanli Emperor because he did not bring proper tribute. He returned some time before November 1619. He brought with him a letter in Chinese inviting the Russians to open trade, but no one in Russia was able to read it until 1675.

Petlin's report  is quite vague. He mentions: the upper Ob; rivers flowing into Lake Ubsa; the local rulers across Mongolia; a Princess Malchikatun who rules the towns of Mongolia and issues permits to cross the Great Wall; the Black Mongols west of the wall and the Yellow Mongols east of it; an 'Iron Tsar' near Bukhara who sends diamonds to China (probably, a reference to the Kashgarian jade tribute trade); the Great Wall (which he thinks runs from the Pacific to Bukhara); several Chinese cities on the way to Peking; Peking; and an 'Ob River' which he seems to think flows from western Mongolia to the Yellow Sea. He mentions lamas, temples with gilded statues, city walls and gates, paved streets and officials who go about with yellow sunshades over their heads. Throughout he emphasizes the remarkable fact that cities are built of stone.

An account of Petlin's expedition was translated into English and published in Samuel Purchas' "Pilgrims" (vol. XIV) (1625); it was apparently well known in the 17th century England: e.g., John Milton is thought to have drawn on it in his description of Mongolia.

Notes

References
 Mark Mancall, Russia and China: Their Diplomatic Relations to 1728, 1971.
 . Volume III, "A Century of Advance", Book Four, "East Asia".
 "A Relation of two Russe Cossacks travailes, out of Siberia to Catay, and other Countries adjoyning thereunto. Also a Copie of the last Patent from the Muscovite. A Copie of  a Letter written to the Emperour from his Governours out of Siberia". Published as Chapter XI in: Samuel Purchas, Haklutyus Posthumus (or, Purchas His Pilgrimes), vol. XIV, pp. 272–291. 1625. Full Text on archive.org
 Роспись Китайского государства и монгольских земель, составленная томским казаком И. Петлиным (Description of the State of Cathay [Kitay] and the Mongolian Lands, compiled by the Tomsk Kazak I. Petlin), in:  Н. Ф. Демидова (N.F. Demidova), В. С. Мясников (V.S. Myasnikov), Русско-китайские отношения в XVII в. Материалы и документы. Т. 1. 1608-1683 (Sino-Russian Relations in the 17th century. Materials and Documents. Vol. 1: 1608-1683). Moscow, Nauka Publishers, 1969. This publication includes two versions  of the Description, both published a number of times previously. 
 The first version, created in Tobolsk between May 16 and July 6, 1619, had been published e.g. in:
  Ф. И. Покровский (F.I. Pokrovsky), "Путешествие в Монголию и Китай сибирского казака Ивана Петлина в 1618 г." ("The travels of the Siberian Cossack Ivan Petlin to Mongolia and China in 1618"), Известия отделения русского языка и словесности имп. Академии наук 1913 г. (Reports of the Department of Russian Language and Literature of the [Russian] Imperial Academy of Sciences), Vol. 18, Book 4, St. Petersburg, 1914, pp. 287–295; 
 J. F. Baddeley, Russia, Mongolia, China, vol. II, London, 1919, pp. 73–86;
 The second version, created in Moscow between September 23  and November 10, 1619, had been published in:
 Н. Ф. Демидова (N.F. Demidova), В. С. Мясников (V.S. Myasnikov), Первые русские дипломаты в Китае (First Russian Diplomats in China), Moscow, 1966, pp. 41–55.

Russian diplomats
Russian explorers
Cossack explorers